Tuone Udaina (1823 – 10 June 1898; Antonio Udina in Italian) was the last person to have any active knowledge of the Dalmatian language, a Romance language that had evolved from Latin along the eastern coast of the Adriatic Sea. He was the main source of knowledge about his parents' dialect, that of the island of Krk, for the linguist Matteo Bartoli, who recorded it in 1897.

Udaina bore the nickname Burbur, the etymology of which is uncertain. Other interpretations include "barbarian" and "barber". 
He worked as a marine postman and as a sexton.

Vegliot Dalmatian was not Udaina's native language, as he had learned it from listening to his parents' private conversations. Udaina had not spoken the Dalmatian language for nearly 20 years before the time he acted as a linguistic informant. No sound recordings were ever made.

When Udaina was accidentally killed at 74 in an explosion during road work on 10 June 1898, the Dalmatian language is generally assumed to have become extinct as no other speakers of the language were found or known to have lived.

References

Bibliography

 
 
 
 
 
 

Last known speakers of a language
1823 births
1898 deaths
Deaths by explosive device
Industrial accident deaths
Dalmatian language
Krk
Accidental deaths in Croatia
People from Primorje-Gorski Kotar County